Deyan Ivanov (born 12 April 1996) is a Bulgarian footballer who most recently played as a centre back for Bulgarian Second League club Sportist Svoge.

Career
Ivanov made his league debut for Levski against Marek Dupnitsa during the 2014–15 campaign. Levski won 6–0 and Ivanov played the full 90 minutes on the pitch.

In October 2015 he suffered a severe injury that took him out for a year and a half. After a recovery in Italy, he signed a new 3-year contract with Levski Sofia

In July 2017, he was loaned to Second League club Botev Vratsa. In the last match of the season, Ivanov scored the winning goal in the 89th minute which secured Botev's first place in the league and the promotion to first league.

References

External links
 
 Profile at levski.bg
 Profile at LevskiSofia.info

1996 births
Living people
Footballers from Sofia
Bulgarian footballers
First Professional Football League (Bulgaria) players
Second Professional Football League (Bulgaria) players
PFC Levski Sofia players
FC Botev Vratsa players
Association football defenders